Iberoformica subrufa is a species of ant that is one of the two species in the genus Iberoformica. Described in 1859 by Roger, the species is mainly distributed to mainland Europe.

References

Formicinae
Hymenoptera of Europe
Insects described in 1859